Ruslan Hajiyev (born on 26 March 1998) is an Azerbaijani footballer who plays as a winger for Sabail in the Azerbaijan Premier League.

Club career
On 12 May 2018, Hajiyev made his debut in the Azerbaijan Premier League for Qarabağ match against Keşla.

Honours
Qarabağ
 Azerbaijan Premier League: 2017–18

References

External links
 

1998 births
Living people
Association football midfielders
Azerbaijani footballers
Qarabağ FK players
Sabail FK players
Azerbaijan Premier League players
Azerbaijan youth international footballers